Oleksandr Yakymenko is a Ukrainian name, which may refer to:
 Oleksandr Yakymenko (footballer), footballer from Odessa
 Oleksandr Yakymenko (politician), Chief of the Security Service of Ukraine
 Oleksandr Yakymenko (judge), Chairman of the Supreme Court of Ukraine